8th Politburo may refer to:
8th Politburo of the Chinese Communist Party
8th Politburo of the Communist Party of Cuba
Politburo of the 8th Congress of the Russian Communist Party (Bolsheviks)
8th Politburo of the Party of Labour of Albania
8th Politburo of the Communist Party of Czechoslovakia
8th Politburo of the Socialist Unity Party of Germany
8th Politburo of the Polish United Workers' Party
8th Politburo of the Romanian Communist Party
8th Politburo of the Lao People's Revolutionary Party
8th Politburo of the Communist Party of Vietnam
8th Politburo of the League of Communists of Yugoslavia
8th Politburo of the Hungarian Socialist Workers' Party
8th Politburo of the Workers' Party of Korea